Al Barsha is a collection of sub-communities in Dubai, United Arab Emirates (UAE). Al Barsha is one of the newer residential developments, and is located in west Dubai, south of Al Sufouh. Al Barsha is bounded by E 11 (Sheikh Zayed Road) and E 311 (Sheikh Mohammad Bin Zayed Road).

Schools
Dubai American Academy
American School of Dubai
Dubai International Academy
Global Indian International School
Nord Anglia International School Dubai
Al Mawakeb School - Al Barsha
Dwight School Dubai

Attractions 

 Dubai Miracle Garden
 Mall of the Emirates
 Ski Dubai
 Dubai Butterfly Garden
 Al Jaber Gallery
 Al Barsha Pond Park
 Al Barsha Mall
 Dreamscape
 History of Cinema Museum
 Dubai Community Theater and Arts Centre

References

Communities in Dubai